Nimba National Forest is a national forest in Nimba County, Liberia. The forest, which borders Guinea and Côte d'Ivoire, has east and west sections that cover 95.91 km² and 91.46 km² respectively. It is also known as the Mount Nimba Forest Reserves.

Mammals
It is thought that the reserves supported populations of chimpanzees before the civil war, and local people report that populations increased in those areas during the war. However, these regions have been heavily impacted by factional fighting, resource extraction and civil displacements over the past 15 years (Kormos et al. 2003)

References
Kormos, R., Boesch, C., Bakarr, M. I. and Butynski, T. (eds.). (2003) West African Chimpanzees. Status Survey and Conservation Action Plan. IUCN/SSC Primate Specialist Group. IUCN, Gland, Switzerland and Cambridge. Uk.

Protected areas of Liberia
Nimba County